Sumire Tsuji (born 29 November 1999) is a Japanese fencer. She represented Japan in the women's team foil event at the 2020 Summer Olympics.

Tsuji won a bronze medal in the individual foil at the 2019 Foil Fencing World Cup, a silver medal as part of the Japanese women's team foil team at the 2019 Junior World Fencing Championships., and a gold medal in the team foil at the 2019 Asian Fencing Championships.

References

1999 births
Living people
Japanese female foil fencers
Fencers at the 2020 Summer Olympics
Olympic fencers of Japan
Fencers at the 2018 Asian Games
Asian Games gold medalists for Japan
Asian Games medalists in fencing
Medalists at the 2018 Asian Games
20th-century Japanese women
21st-century Japanese women